"Be My Baby" is a single by the Ronettes.

Be My Baby may also refer to:

Literature 
 Be My Baby (book), by Ronnie Spector, 1990
 Be My Baby (Amanda Whittington play), 1997
 Be My Baby (Ken Ludwig play), 2005

Music 
 "Be My Baby", by Dick & Dee Dee , 1965
 "Be My Baby", by Ringo Starr from Old Wave, 1983
 "Be My Baby" (Vanessa Paradis song), 1992
 "Be My Baby", by Whigfield from Whigfield III, 2000
 "Be My Baby", by Motörhead from Kiss Of Death, 2006
 "Be My Baby", by Wonder Girls from Wonder World, 2011
 "Be My Baby", by Ariana Grande from My Everything, 2014

Television 
 "Be My Baby" (The Flash), a 1991 episode
 "Be My Baby" (Roseanne), a 1993 episode
 Be My Baby (web series), a 2019–2020 Thai web series

See also
 
 
 " Take Me Home Tonight" (song), by Eddie Money, sometimes known as "Take Me Home Tonight (Be My Baby)" due to the end of the song's chorus